Beyond... (ビヨンド) is the debut album by Japanese singer Kiyotaka Sugiyama released on July 2, 1986 by VAP. The album charted at No. 1 on the Oricon charts.

Background 
Sugiyama had started his solo career after the disbandment of the band Kiyotaka Sugiyama & Omega Tribe, having a charted a single with the song "Sayonara no Ocean" on May 28. The sound was different than what Sugiyama had done before, creating a cool, up-tempo sound instead of the refreshing, pop, windy summer from his Omega Tribe days.

Masanori Sasaji, who was introduced to Sugiyama during the production of his previous album, First Finale, was hired as the arranger for the album.

Track listing

Personnel 

Backing Vocals – Fumiko Hiratsuka, Kiyoshi Hiyama, Miwako Matsuki, Shuji Otsuka, Yasuhiro Kido, Dabbie
Bass – Hideki Matsubara, Naoki Watanabe, Yasuo Tomikura
Drums – Masahiro Miyazaki, Toru Hasebe, Yuichi Togashiki
Guitar – Fujimaru Yoshino, Makoto Matsushita, Takayuki Hijikata
Horn – Eiji Arai, Junichiro Murakami, Kenichiro Hayashi, Susumu Kazuhara
Keyboards – Akira Nishimoto, Hidetoshi Yamada, Jun Sato, Junko Miyagi, Kazuo Ohtani, Masanori Sasaji, Masato Matsuda, Yasuharu Nakanishi
Percussion – Nobu Saito
Producer – Kiyotaka Sugiyama
Programmed By – Atsushi Umehara, Hitoshi Anbai
Saxophone – Jake H. Concepcion
Strings – Maeda Group

Charts

References 

1986 debut albums